Azerbaijanis in Kazakhstan are part of the Azerbaijani diaspora. They are Kazakh citizens and permanent residents of ethnic Azerbaijani background. According to the 2009 census, there were 85,292 ethnic Azerbaijanis living in Kazakhstan; Azerbaijanis comprised 0.5% of Kazakhstan's population and were the country's tenth-largest ethnic minority. Most Azerbaijani-Kazakhs have immigrated to Kazakhstan from the Republic of Azerbaijan; a small group of Iranian Azerbaijanis trapped by the Bolshevik taking of power in 1918 were also forced into Kazakhstan in 1938.

According to 2009 national census 94.8% of Azerbaijanis Kazakhstanis identify as Muslims, and 2.5% as Christians and 1.8% as Atheists.

See also
 Azerbaijan–Kazakhstan relations

References

Azerbaijani diaspora
Ethnic groups in Kazakhstan
Azerbaijani emigrants to Kazakhstan